The Canada Cup (aka Maple Cup) of 1995 was an international football (soccer) tournament, played at the Commonwealth Stadium in Edmonton, Alberta, Canada from 22 May 1995 to 28 May 1995.

Results

Canada vs Northern Ireland

Chile vs Northern Ireland

Canada vs Chile

References
RSSSF
RSSSF details 1995 matches

Canada Cup (soccer)
1995 in Chilean football
1995 in Canadian soccer
1994–95 in Northern Ireland association football
May 1995 sports events in Canada